Julián Omar Ramos Suárez (born 26 January 1988), known as Omar, is a Spanish professional footballer who plays as an attacking midfielder for I-League club Gokulam Kerala.

He amassed La Liga totals of 120 matches and one goal over five seasons, in service of Tenerife, Valladolid and Leganés. He added 164 appearances in the Segunda División (six goals), and played abroad in India later in his career.

Club career

Tenerife
Born in Santa Cruz de Tenerife, Canary Islands, Omar finished his development at local CD Tenerife. He made his professional debut on 20 September 2006 at the age of 18, coming on as a second-half substitute in a 1–2 home loss against Deportivo Alavés in the second round of the Copa del Rey, but spent the vast majority of his early spell with the reserves, also being loaned to lowly UE Lleida.

Omar was promoted to the main squad for 2009–10, with Tenerife back in La Liga after seven years. He played 23 games during the season – albeit only seven starts – as the club was immediately relegated; his first match in the competition was on 29 August 2009, when he came off the bench in a 1–0 defeat at Real Zaragoza.

Valladolid
Prior to being released in June 2012, Omar was loaned to Segunda División teams UD Almería and SD Huesca. The latter bought him on a permanent basis, loaning him immediately to Real Valladolid in the top flight.

In his debut campaign with the Castile and León side, Omar was regularly played by manager Miroslav Đukić, scoring his only goal in the Spanish top division on 1 June 2013 in a 4–2 away loss against RCD Mallorca. Subsequently, Valladolid signed him to a four-year contract.

Leganés
Omar moved to CD Leganés on 4 August 2015, after agreeing to a one-year contract. On 3 July of the following year, after achieving promotion to the top tier, he renewed his link until 2018.

Later career
On 4 December 2018, free agent Omar joined second division club Real Oviedo on a -year deal. On 29 January 2020, he signed an 18-month contract with SD Ponferradina of the same league.

On 26 February 2022, aged 34, Ramos moved to Rajasthan United FC on a one-year deal. He made his debut in the Indian I-League on 8 March, in a 1–0 home victory over Aizawl FC. He scored his first goal on 6 April, through a 25-meter free kick in the 2–1 defeat at Mohammedan SC.

International career
Omar won his only cap for the Spain under-21 team on 17 November 2009, playing the final 16 minutes in a 2–1 away loss to the Netherlands for the 2011 UEFA European Championship qualifiers.

Career statistics

Club

References

External links

1988 births
Living people
Spanish footballers
Footballers from Santa Cruz de Tenerife
Association football midfielders
La Liga players
Segunda División players
Segunda División B players
Tercera División players
CD Tenerife B players
CD Tenerife players
UE Lleida players
UD Almería players
SD Huesca footballers
Real Valladolid players
CD Leganés players
Real Oviedo players
SD Ponferradina players
CD Alcoyano footballers
I-League players
Rajasthan United FC players
Gokulam Kerala FC players
Spain under-21 international footballers
Spanish expatriate footballers
Expatriate footballers in India
Spanish expatriate sportspeople in India